Yohann Bernard (born August 7, 1974) is a breaststroke swimmer from France.

Career
Bernard won the bronze medal in the men's 200 metres breaststroke event at the 1999 European Championships in Istanbul. He represented his native country at the 2000 Summer Olympics in Sydney, Australia, where he finished in seventh place in the 200 m breaststroke, clocking 02:13.31 in the final.

References
 

1974 births
Living people
French male breaststroke swimmers
Olympic swimmers of France
Swimmers at the 2000 Summer Olympics
European Aquatics Championships medalists in swimming